Red Hill is one of the highest points in the county of Hampshire, England.

Red Hill lies on the edge of the Chawton Park Wood in the village of Chawton in Hampshire. There is a fire tower at the highest point.

References 

Hills of Hampshire